Chemical evolution may refer to:
 Abiogenesis, the transition from nonliving elements to living systems
 Astrochemistry, the study of the abundance and reactions of molecules in the universe, and their interaction with radiation
 Cosmochemistry, the study of the chemical compositions in the universe and the processes that led to them
 Evolution of metal ions in biological systems, incorporation of metallic ions into living organisms and how it has changed over time
 Gas evolution reaction, the process of a gas bubbling out from a solution
 Molecular evolution, evolution at the scale of molecules
 Oxygen evolution, the process of generating molecular oxygen through chemical reaction
 Stellar nucleosynthesis, the creation of chemical elements by stellar thermonuclear fusion or supernovae